Al-Aswad ibn Yazid (d. 74 AH or 75 AH) was a well-known scholar from among the taba'een and pupil of Abd-Allah ibn Mas'ud

He was one of the narrators of hadith.

See also
Aswad (name)

References

Tabi‘un Mukhadrimun
Tabi‘un hadith narrators
690s deaths
Year of birth unknown
7th-century Arabs